Echo is a middle grade historical fiction novel written by Pam Muñoz Ryan, illustrated by Dinara Mirtalipova, and published by Scholastic Press in 2015. It is set in Germany and America, primarily in the years leading up to World War II and details how a mysterious harmonica and the music it makes ties together the lives of three children: Friedrich Schmidt, an intern at the Hohner factory; Mike Flannery, an orphan in Philadelphia; and Ivy Maria Lopez, daughter of migrant farm workers. It was named a Newbery Honor book in 2016.

Plot summary
The framing story is set in Germany circa 1864; while playing hide-and-seek with his friends, Otto becomes absorbed in a book he had purchased from a Gypsy entitled The Thirteenth Harmonica of Otto Messenger, which relates the story of three unwanted princesses given over to a witch for safekeeping. Their father, the king, had given each of them to a midwife shortly after their births while he was waiting for a male heir; the midwife, in turn, passed them on to her cousin, a witch. After the heir arrives, the princesses are informed of their royal birth and prepare to rejoin their family; however, rather than releasing them, the witch curses the girls:

Otto is so engrossed in the story that he has wandered into the woods where the princesses have been trapped. He has in fact brought a harmonica with him (one pressed on him by the same Gypsy who sold him the book) and is able to retrieve their spirits, now stored in the harmonica.

When the story resumes almost 70 years later, the harmonica is discovered in a storage room of the Hohner factory by Friedrich Schmidt; it is in a box marked "Marine Band/1896" with a matching cover plate for export to the United States and is distinguished by a red script letter M on the pearwood comb.

The novel traces the journey of the harmonica from Friedrich to two orphan brothers, Mike and Frankie Flannery in Philadelphia, and then to a migrant worker's daughter, Ivy Maria Lopez in California. Each child has unusual musical talent and faces unique challenges in their lives: Friedrich, who dreams of being a conductor, was forced to drop out of school after the bullying that resulted from his appearance, and is threatened with sterilization in Nazi Germany; Mike, a talented pianist, wishes to join Albert N. Hoxie's Philadelphia Harmonica Band of Wizards as a way to escape the orphanage and poverty while taking care of his younger brother, Frankie; and Ivy, just discovering her talent and love for music, is forced to attend a segregated school while helping her father and mother take care of the Yamamoto family farm after the Yamamotos were forced into internment camps after the attack on Pearl Harbor.

First Part 
The harmonica's first messenger after Otto is Friedrich Schmidt. Set in October 1935, Friedrich is a German boy afflicted with a birthmark on his face that causes him to look deformed. After Friedrich was bullied and beaten up at school for his conducting obsession, he works and is taught at the Hohner Harmonica Factory in the town Trossigen in Baden-Württemberg, Germany, where his father used to work. While eating lunch, Friedrich hears music being played and discovers a harmonica with the letter M on it. He pockets the instrument and rushes back to the factory. Since the harmonica was not a traditional instrument in Germany, he hid it in one of the boxes of harmonicas sent to shops in order to protect himself.

Development
Muñoz Ryan began researching the first successful school desegregation case, Roberto Alvarez v. the Board of Trustees of the Lemon Grove School District (1931).during her research into integrated classrooms, she found an old photograph of an elementary school harmonica band, which gave her the ideas of a girl in an integrated band and (as in Hoxie's) a band filled with orphans, which developed into the stories of Ivy and Mike, respectively. Contemporary photographs showed the children played the Marine Band harmonica, so Muñoz Ryan contacted Hohner and visited their harmonica museum in Trossingen, where she was inspired to begin developing Friedrich's story. Ivy’s older brother is named Donald after his death in the end of the book.

Reception
In 2016, the American Library Association named Echo to its list of Newbery Honor winners, alongside Kimberly Brubaker Bradley's The War That Saved My Life and Victoria Jamieson's Roller Girl.

References

External links
 

2015 American novels
Kirkus Prize-winning works
Young adult novels
Newbery Honor-winning works
Scholastic Corporation books